Inga Ravna Eira (born 30 May 1948) is a Norwegian Northern Sami language poet, children's writer, translator and schoolteacher.

Career
Eira was born in Karasjok, in Finnmark, Norway. A schoolteacher, her first children's book, Sámi girječálliid searvi from 1979 was written as a collaboration with her pupils. Her first published poetry was included in the anthology Savdnjiluvvon nagir (1989), jointly with Kaia Nilsen and Ellen Marie Vars. Her second children's book,  from 1992, was illustrated by Iver Jåks. Her first poetry collection was Lieđážan from 1997, with illustrations by Maj-Lis Skaltje. In 2009 she published the poetry collection was eadni ganjaldii mu fuolppuid.

References

1948 births
Living people
People from Karasjok
20th-century Norwegian poets
21st-century Norwegian poets
Norwegian women poets
Norwegian Sámi-language writers